In mathematics, a p-constrained group is a finite group resembling the centralizer of an element of prime order p in a group of Lie type over a finite field of characteristic p.

Definition

If a group has trivial p core Op(G), then it is defined to be p-constrained if the p-core  Op(G) contains its centralizer, or in other words if its generalized Fitting subgroup is a p-group.

All p-solvable groups are p-constrained.

See also

p-stable group
The ZJ theorem has p-constraint as one of its conditions.

References

Finite groups
Properties of groups